Diacyclops thomasi is a species of cyclopoid copepod in the family Cyclopidae.

References

External links

 

Cyclopidae
Articles created by Qbugbot
Crustaceans described in 1882